Electric Cabaret is the fourth studio album by the Danish dance-pop duo Infernal. It was released on 11 August 2008 in Denmark.

In advance of the release, Infernal posted previews for five songs from the album (apart from the first two singles: "Downtown Boys" and  "Whenever You Need Me") on 8 August, on their official website. The album debuted at number three in Denmark. It has since been certified two-times platinum by the International Federation of the Phonographic Industry (IFPI) for sales of 40,000 copies.

A Deluxe Edition of Electric Cabaret was released on 27 April 2009. It consists of the original album and a DVD with a live recording of Infernal's concert at the Skanderborg Festival in Denmark on 9 August 2008, plus backstage footage from the tour. The DVD also includes music videos for all four of the singles from the album. The live DVD is also available separately both physically and digitally from Infernal's music store.

A version of the album with a commentary track stretching over the entire album done in Danish by Paw & Lina, was also made available for download

Track listings

Standard edition

Taiwan edition

Deluxe Edition

Charts and certifications

Charts

Year-end charts

Certifications

Release history

References

External links

2008 albums
2009 albums
Infernal (Danish band) albums